Flower induction is the physiological process in the plant by which the shoot apical meristem becomes competent to develop flowers. Biochemical changes at the apex, particularly those caused by cytokinins, accompany this process. Usually flower induction is followed by flower differentiation, with some notable exceptions such as in kiwifruit, where the two processes are separated. Flower induction can be reversed, but flower differentiation is irreversible, because anatomical changes are in place.

References 

Plant physiology